HotJava (later called HotJava Browser to distinguish it from HotJava Views) was a modular, extensible web browser from Sun Microsystems implemented in Java. It was the first browser to support Java applets, and was Sun's demonstration platform for the then-new technology. It has since been discontinued and is no longer supported. Furthermore, the Sun Download Center was taken down on July 31, 2011, and the download link on the official site points to a placeholder page saying so.

Origins
In 1994, a team of Java developers started writing WebRunner, which was a clone of the internet browser Mosaic.  It was based on the Java programming language.  The name ‘WebRunner’ was a tribute to the Blade Runner movie.

WebRunner's first public demonstration was given by John Gage and James Gosling at the Technology Entertainment Design Conference in Monterey, California in 1995. Renamed HotJava, it was officially announced in May the same year at the SunWorld conference.

The parser code was reused by the standard Java libraries.

Usage
HotJava had somewhat limited functionality compared to other browsers of its time.

More critically, HotJava suffered from the inherent performance limitations of Java virtual machine implementations of the day (both in terms of processing speed and memory consumption) and hence was considerably sluggish.

See also

 Comparison of web browsers
 List of web browsers
 Mozilla Grendel

References

External links

HotJava @ Evolt

History has a Lesson for HotJava
History of Java

Discontinued web browsers
Java platform software
Sun Microsystems software